Samuel Birley Rowbotham (1816 – 23 December 1884, in London) was an English inventor, writer and utopian socialist who wrote Zetetic Astronomy: Earth Not a Globe under the pseudonym Parallax. His work was originally published as a 16-page pamphlet (1849), and later expanded into a book (1865).

Rowbotham's method, which he called zetetic astronomy, models the Earth as a flat disc centered at the North Pole and bounded along its perimeter by a wall of ice, with the Sun, Moon, planets, and stars moving only several thousand miles above the surface of Earth.

Life and career
Rowbotham started out as an organiser of an Owenite community at Manea in The Fens, where he formulated his ideas about the Earth. After measuring a lack of curvature on the long straight drainage ditches of the Bedford Levels in his first Bedford Level experiment, he was convinced of the flatness of the Earth and began to lecture on the topic. He took a little time to learn his trade, running away from a lecture in Blackburn when he couldn't explain why the hulls of ships disappeared before their masts when sailing out to sea. However, as he persisted in filling halls by charging sixpence a lecture, his quick-wittedness and debating skills were honed so much that he could "counter every argument with ingenuity, wit and consummate skill".

When finally pinned down to a challenge in Plymouth in 1864 by allegations that he wouldn't agree to a test, Rowbotham appeared on Plymouth Hoe at the appointed time, witnessed by Richard A. Proctor, a writer on astronomy, and proceeded to the beach where a telescope had been set up. His opponents had claimed that only the lantern of the Eddystone Lighthouse, some 14 miles out to sea, would be visible. In fact, only half the lantern was visible, yet Rowbotham claimed his opponents were wrong and that it proved the Earth was indeed flat so that many Plymouth folk left the Hoe agreeing that "some of the most important conclusions of modern astronomy had been seriously invalidated".

In 1856, Rowbotham married for a second time and had two children, one of whom died in infancy. In 1861 when he was 46, Rowbotham married a 15 year old girl (with whom he was living at the time of the marriage) and settled in London, producing 15 known children, of whom only four survived. He was named in numerous cases of wrongful deaths, including a "death by misadventure" for accidentally poisoning one of his own children. He was named responsible for other deaths using his quack cures of phosphorus. He was also alleged to be using the name "Dr. Samuel Birley", living in a beautiful 12-roomed house, selling the secrets for prolonging human life and curing every disease imaginable. Augustus De Morgan refers to him as S. Goulden. He patented a number of inventions, including a "life-preserving cylindrical railway carriage". He is not known to have held any medical degrees and his professions are named at different times "chemist, physician, journalist, soap boiler".

His book Zetetic Astronomy: The Earth not a Globe appeared in 1864. His lectures continued and concerned citizens addressed letters to the Astronomer Royal seeking rebuttals for his claims. A correspondent to the Leeds Times observed that "One thing he did demonstrate was that scientific dabblers unused to platform advocacy are unable to cope with a man, a charlatan if you will (but clever and thoroughly up in his theory), thoroughly alive to the weakness of his opponents".

Influence
One of Rowbotham's followers, John Hampden, a Christian polemicist, gained notoriety by engaging in raucous public debates with leading scientists of the day. A bet involving the prominent naturalist Alfred Russel Wallace in the famous Bedford Level experiment led to several lawsuits for fraud and libel and Hampden's imprisonment.

In the United States, Rowbotham's ideas were taken up by the Christian Catholic Apostolic Church in 1914, and were promoted widely when the church added a radio station in 1923. His work in the United States was continued by William Carpenter. Carpenter, a printer originally from Greenwich, England, a supporter of Rowbotham and published Theoretical Astronomy Examined and Exposed — Proving the Earth not a Globe in eight parts from 1864 under the name Common Sense. He later emigrated to Baltimore where he published A hundred proofs the Earth is not a Globe in 1885.

Legacy
After Rowbotham's death, Lady Elizabeth Blount continued the Universal Zetetic Society which Rowbotham had founded. The Society published a magazine entitled The Earth Not a Globe Review and remained active well into the early part of the 20th century. After World War I, the movement underwent a slow decline, but it was revived in 1956 as The Flat Earth Society.

See also
 Figure of the Earth
 Geodesy
 Hollow Earth
 Lady Elizabeth Blount
 Mark Sargent
 Modern flat Earth beliefs
 Samuel Shenton
  (documenting why the flat Earth belief is mistaken)
 Wilbur Glenn Voliva

References

External links 
 
 Full text of Zetetic Astronomy: Earth Not a Globe in the Internet Sacred Texts Archive

1816 births
1884 deaths
English writers
Flat Earth proponents
People from Stockport
Owenites